Wesley Township is a township in Kossuth County, Iowa, United States.

History
Wesley Township was organized in 1871.

References

Townships in Kossuth County, Iowa
Townships in Iowa
1871 establishments in Iowa
Populated places established in 1871